John and Henry Crouse Farm Complex is a historic home and farm complex located at Guilderland in Albany County, New York.  The original house was built about 1790 and became the rear wing when the large, two story front addition was constructed about 1860.  It features a shed roofed portico with lattice supports.  Also on the property are a barn and a shed that was used as a tannery.

It was listed on the National Register of Historic Places in 1982.

References

Houses on the National Register of Historic Places in New York (state)
Houses completed in 1790
Houses in Albany County, New York
National Register of Historic Places in Albany County, New York
Farms on the National Register of Historic Places in New York (state)